Priocca is a comune (municipality) in the Province of Cuneo in the Italian region Piedmont, located about  southeast of Turin and about  northeast of Cuneo.

Priocca borders the following municipalities: Canale, Castellinaldo, Govone, Magliano Alfieri, and San Damiano d'Asti.

Demographic evolution

References

Cities and towns in Piedmont
Roero